Changed Man may refer to:

A Changed Man and Other Tales, a 1913 short story collection by Thomas Hardy, and its title story
The Changed Man, a 1998 Iranian romantic comedy film
The Changed Man, the first volume of Orson Scott Card's 1990 short story collection Maps in a Mirror
"Changed Man", a 2009 single by Chris Brown

See also
"Finally Got Myself Together (I'm a Changed Man)", a 1974 song by the Impressions
Strange Man, Changed Man, a 1979 album by Bram Tchaikovsky